Delta TechOps is the maintenance, repair and overhaul (MRO) division of Delta Air Lines, and is headquartered at Hartsfield-Jackson International Airport (ATL) in Atlanta, Georgia. With more than 9,600 Technical Operations employees and 51 maintenance stations worldwide, Delta TechOps is a full-service maintenance provider for the more than 900 aircraft that make up the Delta Air Lines fleet. In addition to maintaining the Delta Air Lines fleet, Delta TechOps also provides MRO solutions and support to more than 150 third-party operators around the world, making it the largest airline MRO provider in North America and the third largest worldwide.

Delta Air Lines does not report financial figures for Delta TechOps, although former Delta COO Gil West advised analysts in January 2019 that 2018 revenue figures "pushed well over $700 million, up $100 million year-over-year."

History

The original Delta Technical Operations Center Jet Base, later known as Technical Operations Center (TOC) 1, opened on June 21, 1960 at Atlanta Municipal Airport (eventually renamed to Hartsfield-Jackson Atlanta International Airport). This facility covered 9 acres, employed 1,600 individuals and provided service exclusively to Delta Air Lines’ fleet of 79 aircraft, including 9 jets. In May 1968, Delta TechOps completed its first expansion, increasing the total space by 7 acres and adding another 1,700 employees, more than doubling the size of the division’s workforce. In 1973, Delta TechOps added another 20-acre hangar, known as TOC 2, increasing the total acreage to 36. By 1982, more additions were needed to accommodate the growing business, and TOC 1 was expanded by another 10 acres.

Up until this point, Delta TechOps had only performed maintenance, repairs and overhauls on Delta Air Lines’ own fleet, but in 1983, the division began offering these services to other airlines. Today, third party business accounts for 20-25% of the division’s workload. The most recent facility expansion, a four-story, 17-acre addition known as TOC 3, was completed in 1991, bringing the total size of the facilities at Hartsfield-Jackson to 63 acres.

Delta TechOps generated revenues of more than $310M in 2006 and by 2009, this amount had reached the half-billion mark. In 2008, Delta TechOps received ISO 9001 certifications for its component maintenance shops. In 2009, Delta TechOps joined EPA's National Partnership for Environmental Priorities in committing to eliminate lead from machine shop operations and recycle 7,000 pounds of lead.

In 2011, Delta TechOps expanded its partnership with Skymark Airlines to provide advance exchange power-by-the-hour services for 25 CFM56-7B powered Boeing 737NG aircraft. Delta TechOps received ISO 9001 certification from the International Standards Organization for its engine maintenance and landing gear shops and is one of only a few airline maintenance, repair and overhaul service providers to achieve the certification. Delta TechOps invested in new MRO technology for engines to cut costs and boost revenue during 2012. In 2013, Delta TechOps and EmpowerMX signed an agreement to employ the cloud-based FleetCycle® MRO Manager product as the primary maintenance-execution tool in all of Delta TechOps airframe MRO facilities. In 2014, Delta TechOps expanded its maintenance providership with Hawaiian Airlines with an integrated component exchange and repair program for 12 Boeing 767 aircraft.

Training and support
In addition to MRO services and support, Delta TechOps also provides third-party operators with technical training, engineering support and inventory management. Delta TechOps aviation maintenance technicians (AMT) make up the majority of the company’s instruction and education corps.

International reach
Delta TechOps maintains a quick-response Disabled Aircraft Recovery Team (D.A.R.T.) which provides worldwide Aircraft on ground support. In recent years Delta TechOps has been recognized as an international industry leader in service flexibility, maintaining dispatch reliability greater than 97 percent fleetwide.

Specialties
Accessories, Actuators, Airframe, APU, Aviation Oxygen, Avionics, C S Ds, Cabin Compressors, Cylinders, Electric Generators, Electric Motors, Engine Accessories (Q E C), Engine Components, Fire Bottles, Fire Extinguishers, Flight Simulator Instruments, Flight Surfaces, Fuel Bladders, Generators, Hydraulics, In Flight Entertainment, Instruments, Landing Gear, Lavatories, Nose Cowls, Other Accessories, Oxygen Cylinders, Oxygen Masks, Passenger Service Units, Pneumatics, Power Plant, Restoration Repair, Starters, Thrust Reverses, Wheels & Brakes

Aircraft serviced

Airbus: A220, A318, A319 and A319neo, A320 and A320neo, A321 and A321neo, A330 and A330neo, A350;

Boeing: 717, 737 (Classic, NG), 747, 757, 767, 777, MD-11, MD-80

Engines serviced

Turbofan: BR715, CF34-3A/B, CF34-8C, CF6-80A/A2, CF6-80C2, CF6-80E1, CFM56-3, CFM56-5, CFM56-7, PW1100G, PW1500G, PW2000, PW4000-94, PW4000-100, Trent 1000, Trent 7000, Trent XWB

APU: GTCP 131-9B, GTCP 331-200

Certifications
Delta TechOps has certified repair stations in the United States (FAA), the European Union (EASA) and other countries, including:

USA: FAA – 121 Certificated Air Carrier No. DALA026A

USA: FAA – 121 Certified Repair Station No. DALA026A

USA: FAA – 145 Certified Repair Station No. DALR026A

EU: EASA – 145 Certified Repair Station No. EASA.145.4380

Argentina: DNA – 145 Approved Maintenance Organization No. 1-B-318

Bermuda: BDCA – Approved Maintenance Organization No. BDA/AMO/187

Brazil: ANAC – 145 Approved Maintenance Organization 0604-04/ANAC

Canada: TCCA/FAA – 145 Approved Maintenance Organization No. DALR026A

Chile: DGAC – 145 Approved Maintenance Organization No. E-110

China (PR): CAAC – 145 Approved Maintenance Organization No. F00100401

Indonesia: DGCA – 145 Approved Maintenance Organization No. 145/62000

Japan: JCAB – 145 Approved Maintenance Organization No. 192

Korea (Republic of): KCASA - 145 Approved Maintenance Organization No. 2005-AMO F06

Saudi Arabia: GACA – applied for

Singapore: CAAS – applied for

Trinidad & Tobago: TTCAA – 145 Approved Maintenance Organization No. TTAR/011

ISO 9001: Delta TechOps Component, Engine and Landing Gear, No. CERT-0025376

U.S. MRO service locations
While most of Delta TechOps' work is done at Hartsfield-Jackson Atlanta International Airport, other maintenance service locations include:

 Baltimore-Washington International Airport
 Bradley International Airport (Hartford)
 Charleston International Airport
 Cincinnati/Northern Kentucky International Airport
 Daniel K. Inouye International Airport (Honolulu)
 Denver International Airport
 Detroit Metropolitan Wayne County Airport
 Fort Lauderdale - Hollywood International Airport
 Harry Reid International Airport (Las Vegas)
 John F. Kennedy International Airport (New York)
 LaGuardia Airport (New York)
 Logan International Airport (Boston)
 Los Angeles International Airport
 Memphis International Airport
 Miami International Airport
 Minneapolis-Saint Paul International Airport
 Newark Liberty International Airport
 Orlando International Airport
 Philadelphia International Airport
 Phoenix Sky Harbor International Airport
 Portland International Airport
 Raleigh-Durham International Airport
 Ronald Reagan Washington National Airport
 Salt Lake City International Airport
 San Diego International Airport
 San Francisco International Airport
 Savannah/Hilton Head International Airport
 Seattle-Tacoma International Airport
 Tampa International Airport

References

External links
 Official Website

Hartsfield–Jackson Atlanta International Airport
Delta Air Lines